Givat Brenner (lit. Brenner Hill),  is a kibbutz in the Central District of Israel. Founded in 1928, it is named after writer Yosef Haim Brenner, who was killed in the Jaffa riots of 1921. It is the largest kibbutz in Israel.

History
Givat Brenner was founded in 1928 by Enzo Sereni and a group of immigrants from Lithuania, Poland and Germany. That same year, pioneers had settled on some 200 dunams (49.4 acres) of land that had been purchased by Moshe Smilansky from the Arab landholders of Aqir and Zarnuqa. During World War II, Givat Brenner supplied products such as jam to the British Army, which laid the foundation for its export business. 

The establishment of an irrigation equipment factory led to the creation of a foundry. The foundry evolved into a specialized aluminum die-casting company, which has produced, among other things, the housings for emergency phones along the New Jersey Turnpike. In 1938, it opened the first kibbutz sanatorium in the country.

Demographics
According to a census conducted in 1931 by the British Mandate authorities, Givat Brenner had a population of 155 inhabitants and a total of 5 residential houses. In 1970 the population was 480.

Education
Givat Brenner Regional School serves the communities of the Brenner Regional Council. The offices of the Regional Council are also located in the Kibbutz.

Economy
Givat Brenner's plant nursery supplies turf for lawns and parks. The kibbutz grows cotton, avocado, wheat and corn, and maintains a dairy farm. Industrial ventures include a furniture factory, metalwork factory, canned foods plant and an irrigation equipment factory, which gradually shut down for financial reasons. The  'House of Dreams' amusement park was established to offset waning income from the orchards, plant nurseries and factories, but was eventually closed.

Landmarks
The Treasure Museum, in the heart of the kibbutz, opened on the Givat Brenner's seventieth anniversary. It houses a collection of artifacts and photographs that tell the story of the kibbutz pioneers.

Notable people

 Achi Brandt,  mathematician noted for pioneering contributions to multigrid methods 
 Aharon Megged, author
 Yitzhak Sadeh, writer and Haganah officer
 Jessie Sampter, poet, close friend of Hadassah founder Henrietta Szold,  established a vegetarian convalescent home on the kibbutz in 1938

References

Further reading
 Gavron, Daniel.  The Kibbutz: Awakening from Utopia.  Lanham, MD: Rowman & Littlefield, 2000.

External links

Official website 
From Socialist Dream to Capitalist Reality  New York Times, April 1998
http://www.givat-brenner.co.il Givat Brenner website 

German-Jewish culture in Israel
Kibbutzim
Kibbutz Movement
Populated places established in 1928
Populated places in Central District (Israel)
Polish-Jewish culture in Israel
Lithuanian-Jewish culture in Israel
1928 establishments in Mandatory Palestine